Tau functions are an important ingredient in the modern theory of integrable systems, and have numerous applications in a variety of other domains. They were originally introduced by Ryogo Hirota  in his direct method approach to soliton equations, based on expressing them in an equivalent bilinear form. The term Tau function, or -function, was first used systematically by Mikio Sato and his students  in the specific context of the Kadomtsev–Petviashvili (or KP) equation, and related integrable hierarchies. It is a central ingredient in the theory of solitons. Tau functions also appear as matrix model partition functions in the spectral theory of Random Matrices, and may also serve as generating functions, in the sense of combinatorics and enumerative geometry, especially in relation to moduli spaces of Riemann surfaces, and enumeration of branched coverings, or so-called Hurwitz numbers.

In the Hamilton-Jacobi  approach to  Liouville integrable Hamiltonian systems,  Hamilton's principal function, 
evaluated on the level surfaces of a complete set of Poisson commuting invariants, plays a rôle similar 
to the -function, serving both as a complete solution of the  
Hamilton-Jacobi equation  and a canonical generating function
to linearizing coordinates.

Definition of Tau-functions
There are two notions of -functions, both introduced by the Sato school. The first is that of isomonodromic -functions 
. The second is  -functions of the Sato-Segal-Wilson type  for integrable hierarchies, such as the KP hierarchy, which are parametrized by linear operators satisfying isospectral deformation equations of Lax type.

A -function of  isospectral type is defined as a solution of the Hirota bilinear equations,
from which the linear operator undergoing isospectral evolution can be uniquely reconstructed. Geometrically, in  the Sato and Segal-Wilson  sense, it is the value of the determinant of a Fredholm integral operator, interpreted as the orthogonal projection of an element of a suitably defined (infinite dimensional) Grassmann manifold onto the origin, as that element evolves under the linear exponential action of a maximal abelian subgroup of the general linear group. It typically arises as a partition function, in the sense of statistical mechanics, many-body quantum mechanics or quantum field theory, as the underlying measure undergoes a linear exponential deformation.

Hirota bilinear residue relation for KP Tau-functions

A KP (Kadomtsev–Petviashvili) -function  
is a function of an infinite number of KP flow variables  that satisfies the following bilinear formal residue equation

identically in the  variables, where  is the 

Kadomtsev-Petviashvili equation

If   is a KP -function satisfying 
the Hirota residue equation and we identify the first three flow variables as
 
it follows that the function

satisfies the  dimensional nonlinear partial differential equation

known as the Kadomtsev-Petviashvili (KP)  equation, which plays a prominent role in plasma physics and in shallow water ocean waves.

Taking further logarithmic derivatives of  gives an infinite sequence of functions that  satisfy further systems of nonlinear autonomous PDE's, each involving partial derivatives of finite order with respect to a finite number of the KP flow parameters .  These are collectively known as the KP hierarchy.

Formal Baker-Akhiezer function and the KP hierarchy 

If we define the (formal) Baker-Akhiezer function 
by Sato's formula
 
and expand it as a formal series in the powers of the variable 

this satisfies an infinite sequence of compatible evolution equations

where  is a linear ordinary differential operator of degree  
in the variable , with coefficients that are functions of the flow variables 
, defined as follows

where  is the formal pseudo-differential operator
 
where
 
is the wave operator and 
denotes the projection to the part of  containing
 .

The pseudodifferential operator  satisfies the infinite system of isospectral deformation equations

and the compatibility conditions for both the system  and 
() are

This is a compatible  infinite system of nonlinear partial differential equations,
known as the KP (Kadomtsev-Petviashvili) hierarchy,  for the functions
, with respect to the set 
 of independent variables, each of which contains 
only a finite number of 's, and derivatives only with respect to the three independent variables  . The first nontrivial case of these
is the Kadomtsev-Petviashvili equation.

Thus, every KP  function provides a solution, at least in the formal sense,
of this infinite system of nonlinear partial differential equations.

Fuchsian isomonodromic systems: Isomonodromic Tau-functions

Consider the overdetermined system of first order matrix partial differential equations

where  are a set of   traceless matrices, 
These are the necessary and sufficient conditions for the based monodromy representation of the fundamental group
 of the Riemann sphere punctured at
the points    corresponding to the rational covariant derivative operator 
 
to be independent of the parameters ; i.e. that changes in these parameters induce an isomonodromic deformation. The compatibility conditions for this system are the Schlesinger equations

Defining the  functions
 
the Schlesinger equations imply that the differential form

on the space of parameters is closed:

and hence, locally exact. Therefore, at least locally, there exists a function 

of the parameters, defined within a multiplicative constant, such that

The function  is called the isomonodromic -function
associated to the fundamental solution  of the system,.
For non-Fuchsian systems, with higher order poles, the generalized monodromy data include Stokes parameters and connection matrices, and there are further isomonodromic deformation parameters associated with the local asymptotics, but the isomonodromic -functions may be defined in a similar way, using differentials on the extended parameter space.

Fermionic VEV (vacuum expectation value) representations

The fermionic Fock space , is a semi-infinite exterior product space

defined on a (separable) Hilbert space  with basis elements 
 and dual basis elements 

The free fermionic creation and annihilation operators 
 act as endomorphisms on
 via exterior and interior multiplication by the basis elements

 
and satisfy the canonical anti-commutation relations

These generate the standard fermionic representation of the Clifford algebra 
on the direct sum ,
corresponding to the scalar product

with the Fock space  as irreducible module.
Denote the  vacuum state, in the zero fermionic charge sector , as

 ,

which corresponds to the Dirac sea of states along the real integer lattice in
which all negative integer locations are occupied and all non-negative ones are empty.

This is annihilated by the following operators

The dual fermionic Fock space vacuum state, denoted , is annihilated by the adjoint operators, acting to the left

Normal ordering  of a product of 
linear operators (i.e., finite or infinite linear combinations of creation and annihilation operators) is defined  so that its vacuum expectation value (VEV) vanishes

In particular, for a product  of a pair 
of linear operators

The fermionic charge operator  is defined as

The subspace  is the eigenspace of 
consisting of all eigenvectors with eigenvalue 

 .

The standard orthonormal basis  for the zero fermionic charge sector  is labelled  by integer partitions
,
where 
is a weakly decreasing sequence of  positive integers, which can equivalently be represented by a Young diagram, as depicted here for the partition 
.

An alternative notation for a partition  consists of the 
Frobenius indices
, where 

The basis element  is then given by acting on the vacuum with a product
of  pairs of creation and annihilation operators, labelled by the Frobenius indices

 

The integers  indicate, relative to the Dirac sea,
the occupied non-negative sites on the integer lattice while 
 indicate the unoccupied negative integer sites.
The corresponding diagram, consisting of infinitely many occupied and unoccupied sites on the integer lattice  that are a finite perturbation of the Dirac sea are referred to as a Maya diagram.

The case of the null (emptyset) partition 
gives the vacuum state, and the dual basis  is defined by

 

Then any KP -function can be expressed as a sum

where  are the KP flow variables,
 is the Schur function 
corresponding to the partition , viewed as a function of the normalized power sum variables

in terms of an auxiliary (finite or infinite) sequence of variables 
 and the constant coefficients 
 may be viewed as the Plucker coordinates of an 
element  
of the infinite dimensional Grassmannian consisting of the orbit, under the action of 
the general linear group , of the subspace 
 
of the  Hilbert space .

This corresponds, under the Bose-Fermi correspondence, to a decomposable element

of the Fock space  which, up to projectivization is the image
of the Grassmannian element  under the 
Plucker map

where   is a basis for the subspace  
 and  denotes projectivization of

The Plucker coordinates  satisfy an infinite set of bilinear
relations, the Plucker relations, defining the Plücker embedding 
into the projecivization   of the fermionic Fock space,
which are equivalent to the Hirota bilinear residue relation.

If  for a group element 
with fermionic representation , then  the -function
 can be expressed as the fermionic vacuum state expectation value (VEV):

where

is the abelian subgroup  of  that generates the KP flows, and

are the ""current"" components.

Multisoliton solutions

If we choose  complex constants

with 's all distinct, and define the functions

we arrive at the Wronskian determinant formula

which gives the general -soliton solution.

Theta function solutions associated to algebraic curves

Let   be a compact  Riemann surface  of genus  and fix a canonical homology basis 

Let  be a basis for the space  of holomorphic differentials  satisfying  the standard normalization conditions

where  is the Riemann matrix  of periods. 
The matrix  belongs to the Siegel upper half space 

The  Riemann  function on  corresponding to the period matrix  is defined to be

a positive divisor of degree  

For any positive integer  let  be the unique meromorphic differential  of the second kind characterized by the following conditions:

.
  is normalized to have vanishing -cycles:

Denote by  the vector of -cycles of :

Denote the image of  under the Abel map 
  

with arbitrary base point .

Then the following is a KP -function:

Matrix model partition functions as KP Tau-functions

Let   be the Lebesgue measure on the  dimensional space  of  complex Hermitian matrices.
Let  be a conjugation invariant integrable density function

Define a deformation family of measures

for small  and let

be the partition function for this 
random matrix model.
Then  satisfies the bilinear Hirota residue equation, and hence is a -function of the KP hierarchy.

Tau-functions of hypergeometric type. Generating function for Hurwitz numbers

Let  be a (doubly) infinite sequence of complex numbers.
For any integer partition 
define the content product coefficient

where the product is over all pairs  of positive integers that
correspond to boxes of the Young diagram of the partition  ,
viewed as positions of matrix elements of the corresponding 
 matrix.
Then, for every pair of infinite sequences 
of the infinite sequence of auxiliary variables   and
, defined  by

the function

is a double KP -function,  both in the 
and the  variables, known as a  function of hypergeometric type.

In particular, choosing

for some small parameter , denoting the corresponding content product coefficient as 
and setting , the resulting 
-function can be equivalently expanded as

where  are the simple Hurwitz numbers, which are 
 times the number of ways in which an element 
 of the symmetric group  in  elements, with cycle lengths equal to the parts of the partition , can be factorized as a product of  -cycles

and

is the power sum symmetric function. Equation thus shows that
the (formal) KP hypergeometric -function corresponding to the content
product coefficients  is a generating
function, in the combinatorial sense, for simple Hurwitz numbers.

References

Dynamical systems
Mathematical physics
Integrable systems
Special functions
Generating functions
Partition functions